Thryssa is a genus of anchovies in the family Engraulidae. 
It contains the following species:

Species
 Thryssa adelae (Rutter, 1897) (Swatow thryssa)
 Thryssa aestuaria (J. D. Ogilby, 1910) (Estuarine thryssa)
 Thryssa baelama (Forsskål, 1775) (Baelama anchovy)
 Thryssa brevicauda T. R. Roberts, 1978 (Short-tail thryssa)
 Thryssa chefuensis (Günther, 1874) (Chefoo thryssa)
 Thryssa dayi Wongratana, 1983 (Day's thryssa)
 Thryssa dussumieri (Valenciennes, 1848) (Dussumier's thryssa)
 Thryssa encrasicholoides (Bleeker, 1852) (False baelama anchovy)
 Thryssa gautamiensis Babu Rao, 1971 (Gautama thryssa)
 Thryssa hamiltonii J. E. Gray, 1835 (Hamilton's thryssa)
 Thryssa kammalensis (Bleeker, 1849) (Kammal thryssa)
 Thryssa kammalensoides Wongratana, 1983 (Godavari thryssa)
 Thryssa malabarica (Bloch, 1795) (Malabar thryssa)
 Thryssa marasriae Wongratana, 1987 (Marasri's thryssa)
 Thryssa mystax (Bloch & J. G. Schneider, 1801) (Moustached thryssa)
 Thryssa polybranchialis Wongratana, 1983 (Humphead thryssa)
 Thryssa purava (F. Hamilton, 1822) (Oblique-jaw thryssa)
 Thryssa rastrosa T. R. Roberts, 1978 (Fly River thryssa)
 Thryssa scratchleyi (E. P. Ramsay & J. D. Ogilby, 1886) (Freshwater anchovy)
 Thryssa setirostris (Broussonet, 1782) (Longjaw thryssa)
 Thryssa spinidens (D. S. Jordan & Seale, 1925) (Bengal thryssa)
 Thryssa stenosoma Wongratana, 1983 (Slender thryssa)
 Thryssa vitrirostris (Gilchrist & W. W. Thompson, 1908) (Orangemouth anchovy)
 Thryssa whiteheadi Wongratana, 1983 (Whitehead's thryssa)

References

 

 
Marine fish genera
Taxa named by Georges Cuvier
Taxonomy articles created by Polbot